Club de Natación Alcorcón was a Spanish swimming and water polo club from Alcorcón, Madrid founded in 1989. Its women's team won both the national championship and the national cup, and it took part in the European Cup, reaching the quarter-finals in 2010. Later that year the club collapsed financially and it was excluded from competition. A new club was subsequently created, CN Ciudad de Alcorcón.

Titles
 División de Honor (1)
 2006
 Copa de la Reina (2)
 2006, 2007

References

Alcorcon
Sport in Alcorcón
Alcorcon
Alcorcon
Sports teams in the Community of Madrid
1989 establishments in Spain
2010 disestablishments in Spain